Elias Stein (5 February 1748, in Forbach – 12 September 1812, in The Hague) was a Dutch chess master. Born in Lorraine into a Jewish family, he settled in The Hague.

Stein was also employed as chess teacher of the sons of William V, Prince of Orange, and thereby introduced chess to the Dutch high society.

He recommended what is now known as Dutch Defence as the best reply to 1.d4 in his book Nouvel essai sur le jeu des échecs, avec des réflexions militaires relatives à ce jeu (1789). His biography was written by lieutenant-colonel F.W. von Mauvillon in the book Anweisung zur Erlernung des Schachspiels (Essen, Germany, 1827).

Works 
 E. Stein: Handleiding tot het schaakspel. (2e herz. en verb. druk) Amsterdam, Van Kesteren, 1851.
 E. Stein: Nieuwe proeve van handleiding tot het schaakspel. (Vert. door Daniël Broedelet). Purmerende, Broedelet & Rijkenberg, 1834. (Div. herdr., o.a. 's-Gravenhage 1843 & Leyden 1850)
 Elias Stein: Nouvel essai sur le jeu des échecs, avec des reflexions militaires relatives a ce jeu. La Haye, aux depens de l'auteur, 1789. (Herdr. o.a. Paris, De La Rue, 1841 & 1850)

References

External links 
 Chess Puzzles by Elias Stein
 Nouvel essai sur le jeu des échecs (Google Books) 
 Handleiding tot het schaakspel ed. 1851 (Google Books)

1748 births
1812 deaths
Dutch chess players
Chess theoreticians
Dutch Jews
Jewish chess players
Jewish Dutch sportspeople
Dutch people of French descent
Dutch people of German-Jewish descent
People from Forbach